Wolfgang Heinz Porsche (born Stuttgart 10 May 1943) is a German-Austrian manager and a member of the Porsche family. He is a shareholder and chairman of the Supervisory Board of Porsche Automobil Holding SE as well as of Porsche AG. He is the youngest son of Ferdinand (Ferry) Porsche and Dorothea Reitz. His oldest brother is Ferdinand (Butzi) Porsche, designer of the Porsche 911.

After school he trained as a metalworker and went on to obtain a degree in Business Administration from the Vienna University of Economics and Business. After qualifying, Porsche established his own business, importing Yamaha motorbikes to Austria. In 1976 he joined Daimler-Benz. Two years later he was appointed to the Supervisory Board of Porsche AG. In 2007 he became Chairman of both Porsche AG and Porsche Automobil Holding SE. In 2008 he also joined the Supervisory Board of Volkswagen AG.

Porsche was married to the director and screenplay writer Susanne Bresser from 1988 until their divorce in 2008. They have two sons. Wolfgang Porsche lives in Zell am See in Austria.

He is a member of board of directors of Porsche Automobil Holding along with Josef Michael Ahorner, Stefan Piëch, Peter Daniell Porsche, Hans Michel Piech, Ferdinand Oliver Porsche and Hans-Peter Porsche. He also sit on the supervisory board of separately listed Volkswagen AG.

References

1943 births
German people of Austrian descent
Businesspeople from Stuttgart
Wolfgang
Living people
Vienna University of Economics and Business alumni